The GrEEK Campus, also GEEK Campus, is a technology and innovation park in Cairo, Egypt, offering workspaces for startups as well as established local and multinational companies. Located in Downtown Cairo, The GrEEK Campus consists of five office buildings with a total space of 25,000 m2.

History 

The campus is the idea and creation of Egyptian businessman, Ahmed Elalfy.
 In 1964, the campus was sold to the American University in Cairo (AUC) to expand and accommodate more students, where it was dubbed “The Greek Campus”. For 50 years it housed the AUC library, Social Sciences building and Jameel Center, among other buildings.

When AUC completed its relocation to another larger campus on the outskirts of Cairo in 2008, and in the outcome of the events of January 2011 and June 2013, a long term rental contract was entered into with Tahrir Alley Technology Park (TATP), the operating company of The GrEEK Campus.

Expansion 

In mid-2019, The GrEEK Campus established a partnership with Monsha'at (the Small and Medium Enterprises General Authority) to manage the operations of Startup Hub Khobar in Saudi Arabia's Eastern Province.

In 2020, The GrEEK Campus launched its second location in Cairo, in Mall of Arabia's commercial workspaces in 6 October City. Spanning 3 zones on a total area of 5,545 m2.

References

External links
 

Science parks